Flagellation  (Latin , 'whip'), flogging or whipping is the act of beating the human body with special implements such as whips, rods, switches, the cat o' nine tails, the sjambok, the knout, etc. Typically, flogging has been imposed on an unwilling subject as a punishment; however, it can also be submitted to willingly and even done by oneself in sadomasochistic or religious contexts.

The strokes are typically aimed at the unclothed back of a person, though they can be administered to other areas of the body. For a moderated subform of flagellation, described as bastinado, the soles of a person's bare feet are used as a target for beating (see foot whipping).

In some circumstances the word flogging is used loosely to include any sort of corporal punishment, including birching and caning. However, in British legal terminology, a distinction was drawn (and still is, in one or two colonial territories) between flogging (with a cat o' nine tails) and whipping (formerly with a whip, but since the early 19th century with a birch). In Britain these were both abolished in 1948.

Current use as punishment

Officially abolished in most countries, flogging or whipping, including foot whipping in some countries, is still a common punishment in some parts of the world, particularly in countries using Islamic law and in some territories which were former British colonies. Medically supervised caning is routinely ordered by the courts as a penalty for some categories of crime in Singapore, Brunei, Malaysia, Indonesia, Tanzania, Zimbabwe and elsewhere.

Historical use as punishment

Judaism
According to the Torah (Deuteronomy 25:1-3) and Rabbinic law lashes may be given for offenses that do not merit capital punishment, and may not exceed 40. However, in the absence of a Sanhedrin, corporal punishment is not practiced in Jewish law. Halakha specifies the lashes must be given in sets of three, so the total number cannot exceed 39. Also, the person whipped is first judged whether they can withstand the punishment, if not, the number of whips is decreased. Jewish law limited flagellation to forty strokes, and in practice delivered thirty-nine, so as to avoid any possibility of breaking this law due to a miscount.

Antiquity
In the Roman Empire, flagellation was often used as a prelude to crucifixion, and in this context is sometimes referred to as scourging. Most famously according to the gospel accounts, this occurred prior to the crucifixion of Jesus Christ.

Whips with small pieces of metal or bone at the tips were commonly used. Such a device could easily cause disfigurement and serious trauma, such as ripping pieces of flesh from the body or loss of an eye. In addition to causing severe pain, the victim would approach a state of hypovolemic shock due to loss of blood.

Typically, the one to be punished was stripped naked and bound to a low pillar so that he could bend over it, or chained to an upright pillar so as to be stretched out. Two lictors (some reports indicate scourgings with four or six lictors) alternated blows from the bare shoulders down the body to the soles of the feet. There was no limit to the number of blows inflicted—this was left to the lictors to decide, though they were normally not supposed to kill the victim. Nonetheless, Livy, Suetonius and Josephus report cases of flagellation where victims died while still bound to the post. Flagellation was referred to as "half death" by some authors, as many victims died shortly thereafter.

From Middle Ages to modern times

The Whipping Act was passed in England in 1530. Under this legislation, vagrants were to be taken to a nearby populated area "and there tied to the end of a cart naked and beaten with whips throughout such market town till the body shall be bloody".

In England, offenders (mostly those convicted of theft) were usually sentenced to be flogged "at a cart's tail" along a length of public street, usually near the scene of the crime, "until his [or her] back be bloody". In the late seventeenth century, however, the courts occasionally ordered that the flogging should be carried out in prison or a house of correction rather than on the streets. From the 1720s courts began explicitly to differentiate between private whipping and public whipping. Over the course of the eighteenth and early nineteenth centuries the proportion of whippings carried out in public declined, but the number of private whippings increased. The public whipping of women was abolished in 1817 (after having been in decline since the 1770s) and that of men ended in the early 1830s, though not formally abolished until 1862. Private whipping of men in prison continued and was not abolished until 1948. The 1948 abolition did not affect the ability of a prison's visiting justices (in England and Wales, but not in Scotland, except at Peterhead) to order the birch or cat for prisoners committing serious assaults on prison staff. This power was not abolished until 1967, having been last used in 1962.

Whipping occurred during the French Revolution, though not as official punishment. On 31 May 1793, the Jacobin women seized a revolutionary leader, Anne Josephe Theroigne de Mericourt, stripped her naked, and flogged her on the bare bottom in the public garden of the Tuileries.  After this humiliation, she refused to wear any clothes, in memory of the outrage she had suffered. She went mad and ended her days in an asylum after the public whipping.

In the Russian Empire, knouts were used to flog criminals and political offenders. Sentences of a hundred lashes would usually result in death. Whipping was used as a punishment for Russian serfs.

In April 2020, Saudi Arabia said it would replace flogging with prison sentences or fines, according to a government document.

Use against slaves

Whipping has been used as a form of discipline on slaves. It was frequently carried out during the period of slavery in the United States, by slave owners and their slaves. The power was also given to slave "patrolers," mostly poor whites authorized to whip any slave who violated the slave codes.

Flogging as military punishment
In the 18th and 19th centuries, European armies administered floggings to common soldiers who committed breaches of the military code.

United States
During the American Revolutionary War, the American Congress raised the legal limit on lashes from 39 to 100 for soldiers who were convicted by courts-martial. Generally, officers were not flogged. However, in 1745, a cashiered British officer's sword could be broken over his head, among other indignities inflicted on him.

As critics of flogging aboard the ships and vessels of the United States Navy became more vocal, the Department of the Navy began in 1846 to require annual reports of discipline including flogging, and limited the maximum number of lashes to 12. These annual reports were required from the captain of each naval vessel. See thumbnail for the 1847 disciplinary report of the USS John Adams (1799). The individual reports were then compiled so the Secretary of the Navy could report to the United States Congress how pervasive flogging had become and to what extent it was utilized. In total for the years 1846–1847, flogging had been administered a reported 5,036 times on sixty naval vessels. At the urging of New Hampshire Senator John P. Hale, the United States Congress banned flogging on all U.S. ships in September 1850, as part of a then-controversial amendment to a naval appropriations bill. Hale was inspired by Herman Melville's "vivid description of flogging, a brutal staple of 19th century naval discipline" in Melville's "novelized memoir" White Jacket. Melville also included a vivid depiction of flogging, and the circumstances surrounding it, in his more famous work, Moby-Dick.

Military flogging was abolished in the United States Army on 5 August 1861.

United Kingdom 
Flagellation was so common in England as punishment that caning (and spanking and whipping) are called "the English vice".

Flogging was a common disciplinary measure in the Royal Navy that became associated with a seaman's manly disregard for pain. Aboard ships, knittles or the cat o' nine tails was used for severe formal punishment, while a "rope's end" or "starter" was used to administer informal, on-the-spot discipline. In severe cases a person could be "flogged around the fleet": a significant number of lashes (up to 600) was divided among the ships on a station and the person was taken to all ships to be flogged on each, or--when in harbour--bound in a ship's boat which was then rowed among the ships, with the ships' companies called to attention to observe the punishment.

In June 1879 a motion to abolish flogging in the Royal Navy was debated in the House of Commons. John O'Connor Power, the member for Mayo, asked the First Lord of the Admiralty to bring the navy cat o' nine tails to the Commons Library so that the members might see what they were voting about. It was the Great "Cat" Contention, "Mr Speaker, since the Government has let the cat out of the bag, there is nothing to be done but to take the bull by the horns." Poet Laureate Ted Hughes celebrates the occasion in his poem, "Wilfred Owen's Photographs": "A witty profound Irishman calls/For a 'cat' into the House, and sits to watch/The gentry fingering its stained tails./Whereupon ...Quietly, unopposed,/The motion was passed."

In the Napoleonic Wars, the maximum number of lashes that could be inflicted on soldiers in the British Army reached 1,200. This many lashes could permanently disable or kill a man. Charles Oman, historian of the Peninsular War, noted that the maximum sentence was inflicted "nine or ten times by general court-martial during the whole six years of the war" and that 1,000 lashes were administered about 50 times. Other sentences were for 900, 700, 500 and 300 lashes. One soldier was sentenced to 700 lashes for stealing a beehive. Another man was let off after only 175 of 400 lashes, but spent three weeks in the hospital. Later in the war, the more draconian punishments were abandoned and the offenders shipped to New South Wales instead, where more whippings often awaited them. (See Australian penal colonies section.) Oman later wrote: 

The 3rd battalion's Royal Anglian Regiment nickname of "The Steelbacks" is taken from one of its former regiments, the 48th (Northamptonshire) Regiment of Foot who earned the nickname for their stoicism when being flogged with the cat o' nine tails ("Not a whimper under the lash"), a routine method of administering punishment in the Army in the 18th and early 19th centuries.

Shortly after the establishment of Northern Ireland the Special Powers Act of 1922 was enacted by the Parliament of Northern Ireland. This Act enabled the government to 'take all such steps and issue all such orders as may be necessary for preserving the peace and maintaining order'. The Home Affairs Minister was empowered to make any regulation felt necessary to preserve law and order. Breaking those regulations could bring a sentenced of up to a year in prison with hard labour, and in the case of some crimes, whipping. This Act was in place until 1973 when it was replaced with the Northern Ireland (Emergency Provisions) Act 1973.

France
Meanwhile, during the French Revolutionary Wars the French Army stopped floggings altogether. The King's German Legion (KGL), which were German units in British pay, did not flog. In one case, a British soldier on detached duty with the KGL was sentenced to be flogged, but the German commander refused to carry out the punishment. When the British 73rd Foot flogged a man in occupied France in 1814, disgusted French citizens protested against it.

Australian penal colonies 

Once common in the British Army and British Royal Navy as a means of discipline, flagellation also featured prominently in the British penal colonies in early colonial Australia. Given that convicts in Australia were already "imprisoned", punishments for offenses committed there could not usually result in imprisonment and thus usually consisted of corporal punishment such as hard labour or flagellation. Unlike Roman times, British law explicitly forbade the combination of corporal and capital punishment; thus, a convict was either flogged or hanged but never both.

Flagellation took place either with a single whip or, more notoriously, with the cat o' nine tails. Typically, the offender's upper half was bared and he was suspended by the wrists beneath a tripod of wooden beams (known as 'the triangle'). In many cases, the offender's feet barely touched ground, which helped to stretch the skin taut and increase the damage inflicted by the whip. It also centered the offender's weight in his shoulders, further ensuring a painful experience.

With the prisoner thus stripped and bound, either one or two floggers administered the prescribed number of strokes, or "lashes," to the victim's back. During the flogging, a doctor or other medical worker was consulted at regular intervals as to the condition of the prisoner. In many cases, however, the physician merely observed the offender to determine whether he was conscious. If the prisoner passed out, the physician would order a halt until the prisoner was revived, and then the whipping would continue.

Female convicts were also subject to flogging as punishment, both on the convict ships and in the penal colonies. Although they were generally given fewer lashes than males (usually limited to 40 in each flogging), there was no other difference between the manner in which males and females were flogged.

Floggings of both male and female convicts were public, administered before the whole colony's company, assembled especially for the purpose.  In addition to the infliction of pain, one of the principal purposes of the flogging was to humiliate the offender in front of his mates and to demonstrate, in a forceful way, that he had been required to submit to authority.

At the conclusion of the whipping, the prisoner's lacerated back was normally rinsed with brine, which served as a crude and painful disinfectant.

Flogging still continued for years after independence. The last person flogged in Australia was William John O'Meally in 1958 in Melbourne's Pentridge Prison.

Contemporary Syria 
In Syria  where torture of political dissidents, POWs and civilians is extremely common, flagellation has become one of the most common forms of torture. Flagellation is used by both the Free Syrian Army and the Syrian Arab Army, but is not practiced by the Syrian Democratic Forces. ISIS most commonly used flagellation in which people would be tied to a ceiling and whipped. It was extremely common in Raqqa Stadium, a makeshift prison where prisoners were tortured. It was also common for those who did not follow ISIS strict laws to be publicly flogged.

As a religious practice

Antiquity
During the Ancient Roman festival of Lupercalia, young men ran through the streets with thongs cut from the hide of goats which had just been sacrificed, whipping people with the thongs as they ran. According to Plutarch, women would put themselves in their way to receive blows on the hands, believing that this would help them to conceive or grant them an easy delivery. The eunuch priests of the goddess Cybele, the galli, flogged themselves until they bled during the annual festival called Dies Sanguinis. The initiation ceremonies of Greco-Roman mystery religions also sometimes involved ritual flagellation, as did the Spartan cult of Artemis Orthia.

Christianity

The Flagellation, in a Christian context, refers to an episode in the Passion of Christ prior to Jesus' crucifixion. The practice of mortification of the flesh for religious purposes has been utilised by members of various Christian denominations since the time of the Great Schism in 1054. Nowadays the 
instrument of penance is called a discipline, a cattail whip usually made of knotted cords, which is flung over the shoulders repeatedly during private prayer.

In the 13th century, a group of Roman Catholics, known as the Flagellants, took self-mortification to extremes. These people would travel to towns and publicly beat and whip each other while preaching repentance. The nature of these demonstrations being quite morbid and disorderly, they were during periods of time suppressed by the authorities. They continued to reemerge at different times up until the 16th century. Flagellation was also practised during the Black Plague as a means to purify oneself of sin and thus prevent contracting the disease. Pope Clement VI is known to have permitted it for this purpose in 1348.

Martin Luther, the Protestant Reformer, regularly practiced self-flagellation as a means of mortification of the flesh before leaving the Roman Catholic Church. Likewise, the Congregationalist writer Sarah Osborn (1714-1796) also practiced self-flagellation in order "to remind her of her continued sin, depravity, and vileness in the eyes of God". It became "quite common" for members of the Tractarian movement (see Oxford Movement, 1830s onwards) within the Anglican Communion to practice self-flagellation using the discipline. St. Thérèse of Lisieux, a late 19th-century French Discalced Carmelite nun considered in Catholicism to be a Doctor of the Church, is an influential example of a saint who questioned prevailing attitudes toward physical penance. Her view was that loving acceptance of the many sufferings of daily life was pleasing to God, and fostered loving relationships with other people, more than taking upon oneself extraneous sufferings through instruments of penance. As a Carmelite nun, Saint Thérèse practiced voluntary corporal mortification.

Some members of strict monastic orders, and some members of the Catholic lay organization Opus Dei, practice mild self-flagellation using the discipline. Pope John Paul II took the discipline regularly. Self-flagellation remains common in Colombia, the Philippines, Mexico, Spain and one convent in Peru.

Shi'a Islam

As suffering and cutting the body with knives or chains (matam) have been prohibited by Shi'a marjas like Ali Khamenei, Supreme Leader of Iran, some Shi'a observe mourning with blood donation which is called "Qame Zani" and flailing. Yet some Shi'ite men and boys continue to slash themselves with chains (zanjeer) or swords (talwar) and allow their blood to run freely.

Certain rituals like the traditional flagellation ritual called Talwar zani (talwar ka matam or sometimes tatbir) using a sword or zanjeer zani or zanjeer matam, involving the use of a zanjeer (a chain with blades) are also performed. These are religious customs that show solidarity with Husayn and his family. People mourn the fact that they were not present at the battle to fight and save Husayn and his family. In some western cities, Shi'a communities have organized blood donation drives with organizations like the Red Cross on Ashura as a positive replacement for self-flagellation rituals like Tatbir and Qame Zani.

As a sexual practice

Flagellation is also used as a sexual practice in the context of BDSM. The intensity of the beating is usually far less than used for punishment.

There are anecdotal reports of people willingly being bound or whipped, as a prelude to or substitute for sex, during the 14th century. Flagellation practiced within an erotic setting has been recorded from at least the 1590s evidenced by a John Davies epigram, and references to "flogging schools" in Thomas Shadwell's The Virtuoso (1676) and Tim Tell-Troth's Knavery of Astrology (1680). Visual evidence such as mezzotints and print media in the 1600s is also identified revealing scenes of flagellation, such as in the late seventeenth-century English mezzotint  "The Cully Flaug'd" from the British Museum collection.

John Cleland's novel Fanny Hill, published in 1749, incorporates a flagellation scene between the character's protagonist Fanny Hill and Mr Barville. A large number of flagellation publications followed, including Fashionable Lectures: Composed and Delivered with Birch Discipline (c1761), promoting the names of ladies offering the service in a lecture room with rods and cat o' nine tails.

See also 

 Algolagnia
 Flagellant confraternities
 Flaying
 Florentine flogging
 List of films and TV containing corporal punishment scenes
 Mortification of the flesh
 Paddle (spanking)
 Spanking

References

Further reading 
 Bean, Joseph W. Flogging, Greenery Press, 2000. 
 Bertram, James Glass. (1877 edition). Flagellation and the Flagellants: A History of the Rod. London: William Reeves. 
 Conway, Andrew. The Bullwhip Book. Greenery Press, 2000. 
 Gibson, Ian. The English Vice: Beating, Sex and Shame in Victorian England and After.  London: Duckworth, 1978. 
 Martin, James Kirby; Lender, Mark Edward. A Respectable Army: The Military Origins of the Republic, 1763-1789. Arlington Heights, Ill.: Harlan Davidson, 1982. 
 Oman, Charles. Wellington's Army, 1809-1814. London: Greenhill, (1913) 1993. 
 
 Ricker, Kat. Doubting Thomas, Trillium Press, 2010.  Suspense thriller examining the dark nature of saintliness, including flagellation.
 Tomasson, Katherine & Buist, Francis. Battles of the '45. London: Pan Books, 1974.

External links 

Page about corporal punishment in the world
"Forensic and Clinical Knowledge of the Practice of Crucifixion" by Dr. Frederick Zugibe
Pilot Guides - Flogging in penal Australia (including animation) 
Information about a public punishment in Iran because alcohol and sex outside marriage
Catholic Encyclopedia: Flagellation
Suffering and Sainthood  The importance of penance and mortification in the Catholic Church

Corporal punishments
Pain
Paraphilias
Religious practices
Religious rituals
 
Spanking